Kathy Goudie is a former Canadian politician, who represented the electoral district of Humber Valley in the Newfoundland and Labrador House of Assembly from 2003 to 2007.

She resigned from the legislature on January 19, 2007, after she was named in a report by provincial auditor John Noseworthy as having double-billed $3,818 in constituency expenses. Goudie, who attributed the double-billing to a clerical error, repaid the amount and was cleared of any criminal wrongdoing.

Electoral record

|-

|-

References

Progressive Conservative Party of Newfoundland and Labrador MHAs
Living people
Women MHAs in Newfoundland and Labrador
Year of birth missing (living people)
21st-century Canadian politicians
21st-century Canadian women politicians